Ana Cláudia Trindade Araújo da Silva is a Brazilian artistic gymnast that represented Brazil at the 2008 Summer Olympics. She contributed a score of 13.375 on floor during the team final to help the team finish in eighth. Individually, she finished 22nd in the all-around final. She was the 2008 national all-around champion.

References 

1992 births
Living people
Brazilian female artistic gymnasts
Gymnasts at the 2007 Pan American Games
Gymnasts at the 2008 Summer Olympics
Olympic gymnasts of Brazil
Pan American Games silver medalists for Brazil
Pan American Games medalists in gymnastics
People from Natal, Rio Grande do Norte
South American Games gold medalists for Brazil
South American Games silver medalists for Brazil
South American Games medalists in gymnastics
Competitors at the 2006 South American Games
Competitors at the 2010 South American Games
Medalists at the 2007 Pan American Games
Sportspeople from Rio Grande do Norte
21st-century Brazilian women
20th-century Brazilian women